Countess Mary of Nassau-Siegen (February 1491 – 1547), official titles: Gräfin zu Nassau, Vianden und Diez, was a countess from the House of Nassau-Siegen, a cadet branch of the Ottonian Line of the House of Nassau, and through marriage Countess of Holstein-Schauenburg-Pinneberg.

Biography
Mary was born in Vianden in February 1491 as the second daughter and sixth and youngest child of Count John V of Nassau-Siegen and his wife Landgravine Elisabeth of Hesse-Marburg. Mary was born in the County of Vianden, that her uncle Engelbert II of Nassau had pledged to Mary’s father. Her family spent most of the time there from 1489 onwards, because to get to know these new areas and to include them in his administration, Mary’s father had to stay there for longer periods.

Mary married in February 1506 to Count Jobst I of Holstein-Schauenburg-Pinneberg (1483 – Bückeburg, 5 June 1531). It was a double wedding, on the same day Mary’s elder sister Elisabeth married to Count . A banquet was also held in the city hall in Siegen at which both brides and grooms were present. The feast with the city magistrates was paid for by the brides’ father and the city council donated 16 oxen and 19 pigs for the feast. On 16 February 1506, the ʻBeilagerʼ of the two sisters was celebrated in Dillenburg with the greatest of festivities. The purchase of gold fabric for 747 guilders and silk fabric for 396 guilders at the trade fair in Mainz for these celebrations and the wedding of their brother William in Koblenz in May 1506, as well as the unusually high total expenditure of 13,505 guilders in the accounts of 1505/1506, show that these weddings must have been splendid events.

Mary’s husband was the son of Count John IV of Holstein-Schauenburg-Pinneberg and his wife Lady Cordula of Gemen. Jobst succeeded his father in 1527.

Mary died in Siegen in 1547.

Issue
From the marriage of Mary and Jobst the following children were born:
 Otto (1507/8 – after 25 July 1514).
 Henry (baptised 3 September 1509 – 2 May 1529).
 Elisabeth (? – 15 January 1545), Abbess of  1520–1527. She married on 13 February 1537 to Count John IX of Sayn-Hachenburg (? – 20 March 1560).
 John (before 25 November 1512 – Bückeburg, 10 January 1560), married in Aurich on 23 May 1555 to Countess Elisabeth of East Frisia (10 January 1531-5/6 September 1558).
 Count Adolf XIII (? – Brühl, 20 September 1556), was first a canon in Cologne, Liège and Mainz. Succeeded his father in 1531. Became Archbishop and Elector of Cologne in 1547.
 Cordula ( – before 1542), married:
 on 8 April 1529 to Count Everwin of Bentheim (? – 13 December 1530).
 in 1536 to Count  (? – between 17 Jun 1552 and 21 May 1556).
 Count Otto IV ( – Bückeburg, 22 December 1576), was first a canon in Cologne and Hildesheim. Succeeded his brother Adolf in 1544. He married:
 on 16 July 1544 to Duchess Mary of Pomerania (2 February 1527 – 16 February 1554).
 in Celle on 5 June 1558 to Duchess  (1539 – Detmold, 3 September 1586).
 Anton (? – Godesburg Castle, 18 June 1558), was first a canon in Cologne and Hildesheim. Succeeded his brother Adolf as Archbishop and Elector of Cologne in 1556.
 Lord  (? – 29 May 1581), became Lord of Gemen in 1557. Was lieutenant general in the Dutch States Army.
  (? –  near Recklinghausen, 17 December 1565), was a canon in Cologne.
 William (1523 – Rinteln, between 20 August 1579 and 21 October 1580), was provost at Hildesheim Cathedral.
 a daughter (28 August 1522 – ?).
 Ernst (? – Diez, 26 October 1563), married in Waldenburg on 17 October 1559 to Countess Mary of Hohenlohe-Waldenburg (1530 – 16 September 1565).

Ancestors

Notes

References

Sources
 
 
 
 
 
 
 
 
 
 
 
 
  (1882). Het vorstenhuis Oranje-Nassau. Van de vroegste tijden tot heden (in Dutch). Leiden: A.W. Sijthoff/Utrecht: J.L. Beijers.

External links
 Holstein. In: An Online Gotha, by Paul Theroff.
 Nassau. In: Medieval Lands. A prosopography of medieval European noble and royal families, by Charles Cawley.
 Nassau Part 4. In: An Online Gotha, by Paul Theroff.
 Schleswig-Holstein: E. Grafen von Holstein-Schauenburg 1290-1640. In: Medieval Lands. A prosopography of medieval European noble and royal families, by Charles Cawley.

|-

1491 births
1547 deaths
Mary of Nassau-Siegen
Mary of Nassau-Siegen
∞|Mary of Nassau-Siegen
15th-century German women
16th-century German women